Thameside Promenade, or Thames Side Promenade, is a public park and promenade in Reading, Berkshire, England, located next to the River Thames. It stretches along the south (Reading) side of the river, to the west of Caversham Bridge, and forms part of the Thames Path long distance footpath. The park includes grassland behind the promenade.

Thameside Promenade form part of a series of riverside open spaces, managed by Reading Borough Council, that stretch along one or other side of the River Thames throughout its passage through Reading. From west to east these are Thameside Promenade, Caversham Court, Christchurch Meadows, Hills Meadow, View Island and King's Meadow.

The principle access to Thameside Promenade is from the eastern (Caversham Bridge) end, where there is a car park and Reading Rowing Club have their boathouse. A little further along, access is possible from Rivermeade Leisure Centre, which occupies a site on the grassland behind the promenade. About half-way along the promenade it is intersected by Cow Lane, and beyond that point the farmland behind the promenade is used as part of the Reading Festival site. In contrast to the relatively flat land on the promenade side of the river, the land on the opposite bank rises steeply into Caversham Heights, and the path provides good views of the up-market riverside housing along the Warren and the hills behind.

References

External links 

 Page on Thameside Promenade from Reading Borough Council

Parks and open spaces in Reading, Berkshire